The Rocks, also known as Raven's Rock and Raven Rocks, is a late-18th-century stone residence and  farm complex near Charles Town, Jefferson County, in the U.S. state of West Virginia. The Rocks is a historic district consisting of four contributing structures. The primary structure is a 2-and-a-half-story stone residence known as The Rocks, which was built around 1790, in the Georgian architectural style.

Geography and setting 
It is accessible from Ann Lewis Road via Westside Lane.

See also 

 National Register of Historic Places listings in Jefferson County, West Virginia

References

Bibliography

External links 

1750 establishments in Virginia
1790 establishments in Virginia
Colonial architecture in West Virginia
Colonial Revival architecture in West Virginia
Farms on the National Register of Historic Places in West Virginia
Georgian architecture in West Virginia
Historic districts in Jefferson County, West Virginia
Houses completed in 1750
Houses completed in 1790
Houses in Jefferson County, West Virginia
Houses on the National Register of Historic Places in West Virginia
National Register of Historic Places in Jefferson County, West Virginia
Stone houses in West Virginia